Kelly Lee Carlson (born February 17, 1976) is an American actress and model. She is best known for her role as Kimber Henry in the FX drama series Nip/Tuck.

Career
Carlson was raised in Bloomington, Minnesota, and attended the Academy of Holy Angels in Richfield, Minnesota. In addition to her acting career, she has also modeled, including the advertisement campaigns for Miller Lite, Rembrandt, and Oliver Peoples sunglasses. She appeared in the August 2004 issue of Maxim Magazine and on the cover of the October 2004 issue of Stuff Magazine.

Carlson is the spokesperson for Smile Network International, a Minnesota-based humanitarian organization that provides reconstructive surgeries and related health care services to impoverished children and young adults in developing countries. An enthusiastic equestrian since age seven, Carlson lobbied a bill to prevent both inhumane transport of American horses to slaughterhouses in Mexico and Canada as well as roundups of wild horses by government authorities in January 2010.

Carlson started out in theater, performing in productions of Vanities, Cheaters, Girls Guide to Chaos, Charlotte's Web, and Can't Trust the Mate. In 2001, Carlson was listed on Tear Sheet Magazines 50 Most Beautiful list and also appeared as an extra in the film 3000 Miles to Graceland. In 2003, she booked a guest role in the pilot episode of the FX drama series Nip/Tuck. Her character, Kimber Henry, quickly became popular with audiences, and she appeared in several episodes of the first and second seasons, eventually becoming a regular in the show's third season. She remained with the series until it wrapped up production in March 2010.

Outside of Nip/Tuck, she has appeared in several feature films, including Paparazzi (2004), The Marine (2006), the direct-to-video sequel Starship Troopers 2: Hero of the Federation (2004), and a supporting role in the comedy film Made of Honor (2008) alongside Patrick Dempsey and Michelle Monaghan. She has also made guest spots on Everwood, CSI: Crime Scene Investigation, CSI: Miami, Monk, and The Finder. She was also listed at #43 on Maxim magazine's Hot 100 of 2005 list, and ranked at #94 on their Hot 100 of 2007 list.

She was initially cast in the 2007 film Dead of Winter (later retitled Killer Movie) alongside Leighton Meester and Kaley Cuoco, but was replaced by former Pussycat Doll turned actress Cyia Batten before filming began, due to creative differences with the director. After completing work on the final episodes of Nip/Tuck in 2009, Carlson segued into a recurring role on The CW sequel of Melrose Place, playing a Hollywood madam. She also had a short appearance in the 2009 Canadian television film Degrassi Goes Hollywood. She was next seen in Ghostfacers, an online spin-off of The CW dark fantasy series Supernatural.

Personal life
Carlson is trained in Kali. She is also a sponsor and volunteer for several organizations, including LongRun Thoroughbred Retirement Society and Wounded Warriors.

Filmography

Film

Television

Web

References

External links

 

1976 births
Living people
Actresses from Minneapolis
American eskrimadors
American film actresses
American television actresses
People from Bloomington, Minnesota
Sportspeople from Minneapolis
21st-century American actresses